The Thomas Corwin was a United States revenue cutter and subsequently a merchant vessel. These two very different roles both centered on Alaska and the Bering Sea.  In 1912, Frank Willard Kimball wrote: "The Corwin has probably had a more varied and interesting career than any other vessel which plies the Alaskan waters."

Thomas Corwin was the first revenue cutter to regularly cruise the Bering Sea and the Arctic Ocean. Built in the state of Oregon, she was finished and commissioned in San Francisco which remained her home port. She had at least eight captains during her federal career, but is particularly associated with two: the cool and resolute Calvin L. Hooper and the volatile Michael A. Healy. She continued operating in the Bering Sea as a merchant and charter vessel after she was sold in 1900.

As a merchant vessel, the SS Corwin started out as a support vessel for minerals exploration, and subsequently was extensively modified to carry passengers.  She served coastal ports on Norton and Kotzebue Sounds, the Seward Peninsula, and the Bering Strait during the shipping season, and generally wintered in Puget Sound.  She was the first steamer to reach Nome in the spring  multiple years, and also frequently the last steamer out in the fall. Her Master through most of her commercial service was Ellsworth Luce West. She attempted to rescue the Karluk survivors from Wrangel Island and participated in the search for four missing Karluk crewmen in 1914.

Construction

The Corwin was named for Thomas Corwin, a well-known mid-nineteenth-century politician who served as  Secretary of the Treasury during Millard Fillmore's presidency.  She was the second of three Revenue Cutter Service and Coast Guard vessels to bear the name (there was also a patrol boat Cape Corwin).

She was built as a single-screw steam-powered topsail schooner by Oregon Iron Works at Albina (Portland) Oregon in 1876  and commissioned at San Francisco in 1877. She was constructed of fir and "fastened with copper, galvanized iron, and locust tree nails".  Her appearance was typical of revenue cutters of the period, flush-decked (or nearly so) with clipper bow, fantail stern, two sail-bearing masts, pilot house and funnel amidships and a deckhouse (probably including the upper parts of the engine and boiler rooms) beneath and extending behind the pilot house. The boiler powering the propulsion machinery was of the Scotch marine boiler type and was the first instance of that type of boiler on a Revenue Cutter Service vessel. The addition of steam jackets on the cylinders to reduce condensation losses was another innovation new to the service.  Her cost and displacement were somewhat greater than the Dexter-class (1874) cutters of similar length and overall design.

Construction of the Corwin was contracted in May 1875 with completion scheduled for February 28, 1876. Captain John W. White was construction superintendent for the Revenue Cutter Service.  The Corwin was the first government vessel constructed in the state of Oregon, and a large crowd came out to see her launched August 23, 1876. Oregon Iron Works became insolvent that fall and was declared bankrupt; this resulted in liens filed against the vessel by suppliers and subcontractors for unpaid bills.  On January 2, 1877, Judge J. Deady of the U.S District Court, Oregon District ruled that the lien of libellants Coffin and Hendry was valid, that the government was not yet the owner of the vessel and had not been in possession when the vessel was seized by the marshal on November 29.  However, the Corwin had been extricated about January 1, 1877 by Captain White and the USRC Rush and moved to the middle of the Columbia River (another source has this about January 10).  The Government appealed Judge Deady's ruling and Coffin and Hendry withdrew their claim on the basis of assurances that they would be paid faster if they settled. After a flurry of unsuccessful legal actions by other claimants, the Corwin was  removed to San Francisco where she was completed at a cost of $10150.77 and subsequently commissioned. Congress was still considering suppliers and workmen's claims in 1884.

The Corwin was reported to be capable of 12 knots under sail (48-hour average with a beam wind), 11.5 knots under steam alone, and 13–14 knots under combined power. In 1900, her speed (probably cruising speed) was reported as 9 knots.  Details of the Corwin's original three-gun armament are not available.  In 1891 she reportedly carried four three-inch breech-loading rifles and two Gatling guns.  In July 1891, the New York Times reported that she would be rearmed with six-pounder Hotchkiss rapid-fire guns.

Federal career

The Corwin spent her entire career in the Pacific and Arctic oceans; her home port throughout her government service was San Francisco.  She made her first trip to northern waters in 1877 under Captain J.W. White. In 1880 and 1881  with Calvin L. Hooper commanding and Michael Healy as Executive Officer, she searched in the Arctic for the USS Jeannette, a lost exploration vessel, and two lost whalers, Vigilant and Mount Wollaston. For this expedition, she was sheathed with one-inch oak planks from two feet above the water line to six feet below, with the oak applied over the copper and secured with 2.5-inch composition nails.  Also added was an ice-breaking attachment for her bow, constructed of 3/8 inch iron plate, which could be put in place when needed. Captain Hooper sent out exploratory parties by dogsled along the Siberian arctic coast. Artifacts and stories collected from the Chukchi residents of the coast confirmed that the Vigilant had been lost with no survivors, and apparently had picked up survivors from the Mount Wollaston before her own disaster.  In the course of the Corwin's 1880 cruise, Captain Hooper located and mapped coal deposits in cliffs east of Cape Lisburne, Alaska, previously discovered by Captain E.E. Smith, the Corwin's ice pilot. The crew mined coal from these deposits in both 1880 and 1881, and the site has since been known as the Corwin coal mine. On a visit to various Alaskan islands, they confirmed the St. Lawrence Island famine which killed over 1000 people.

In 1881 the Corwin carried a scientific detachment including John Muir, Irving C. Rosse, M.D., and Edward W. Nelson, and in the course of the search for the Jeannette landed parties on Herald and Wrangel Islands in the Chukchi Sea. The Rodgers crew was picked up by the whaler North Star and later transferred to the Corwin which returned them to San Francisco. In October 1882 she participated in the Angoon Bombardment which was the shelling and burning of the Tlingit village Angoon in retaliation for a hostage-taking incident. A contemporary letter discovered about 1990 partly confirms and partly refutes the official Navy account of this incident. Her voyages in 1884 and 1885 included explorations by boat detachments of the Kobuk (1884 and 1885; Healy wrote Kowak) and Noatak (1885) rivers in Alaska and the first ascent and investigation of the newly formed Bogoslof volcano in the Aleutians.

The Corwin was replaced on the Arctic patrol by the USRC Bear starting in 1886.  Among the reasons for this change was the Corwin's limited coal capacity which interfered with long cruises. The Corwin returned to the Bering Sea in 1886 and from 1890 to 1897 to combat fur seal poaching. In December 1893 she carried dispatches to US ambassador Albert S. Willis in Hawaii at the height of the political crisis following the deposition of Queen Liliuokalani.  Corwin's arrival there caused some consternation since it was thought it might signal US intervention to restore the queen.  The Corwin went into the dockyard at Quartermaster Harbor, Washington for extensive repairs including refastening and some engine work before the 1896 season.  She operated under Navy orders with a Revenue Service crew during the Spanish–American War, serving around San Diego, and was returned to the United States Treasury Department in August 1898. She was back in service in Alaska in 1899 The Corwin was decommissioned and sold February 14, 1900 for 16,500 and was replaced on the Bering Sea patrol by the USRC Manning. Corwin remained active in the Bering Sea as a merchant and charter vessel after she was sold.

Merchant career

Minerals exploration
In 1900 Ellsworth Luce West, a whaling captain from Martha's Vineyard, and some Boston investors formed a company to develop the coal deposits near Cape Lisburne to supply the Nome market.  Needing a suitable ship, they entered the winning bid for the Corwin and organized as the Corwin Trading Company.  The project increased in scope when one investor (veteran prospector, engineer, and writer A.G. Kingsbury) pledged Nome gold claims for his shares. Although Kingsbury described them as "conservative Boston capitalists" the investors appear to have been as much enthusiasts as any Nome prospectors; all insisted on joining the expedition.  To create cargo space in the Corwin, West had the entire wardroom torn out. The lost accommodations were replaced with a cabin constructed from the stern to the engine room, creating a raised poop deck.  This modification is shown clearly in a 1902 photograph. West describes the Corwin as brig-rigged in this period, but photos from 1900 continue to show a gaff on the foremast and no yards crossed on the mainmast, so this is more a difference of terminology than a change of sail-plan.

Captain West could not obtain a passenger license for the ship without having her re-caulked, so the small number of passengers were signed as crew members. She went up to Nome carrying expedition equipment and general cargo and from about June 3–10 was occupied with the rescue and salvage of the barkentine Catherine Sudden, which had suffered a punctured hull and two broken masts hitting ice. A little later she set out on a prospecting expedition to Cape Chaplino and stopped at St Lawrence Island about June 17.  There she encountered the Russian steamer Progress, chartered by American mining engineer Washington Vanderlip and his Russian backers.  Vanderlip hired the Corwin to clear a channel through the ice so Progress could reach Cape Chaplino and the clear water just off the Siberian coast.

Vanderlip described the Corwin's action as an icebreaker:  "Some of the ice the Corwin can push to one side or the other but when this is not possible she backs up in order to get good headway and charges the obstruction and strikes it fairly between the eyes. She comes to a dead stop and quivers from stem to stern with the tremendous impact A rending grinding noise is heard and the berg which challenged us is a berg no longer..."

Finding the streams near Cape Chaplino still ice-clogged, the Corwin returned to Nome. In mid-July she headed north on a minerals exploration trip.  She reached the coal deposits after prospecting stops at Grantley Harbor (adjacent to Port Clarence, Alaska) and along the coast. The largest seam had already been staked by a competing company (that party traveled by land), but the Corwin's party staked several other claims, mined and loaded coal, and returned to Nome with 100 tons (four lighter-loads) to sell. Coal was handled in sacks of 200 lb, lowered down the cliffs by rope. It reportedly sold tor $18–20 per ton at Nome.  A second  trip developed the mines and brought out 25 tons.

In April 1901 the Corwin was towed from Port Townsend to Esquimalt and hauled out for refitting.  She then spent most of that summer tied to the dock for nonpayment of the dockyard bill. Captain West, who had spent the early part of the season as second mate on an east coast collier, was eventually sent west with $2000 to settle up.  After paying the bills, he set about finding work for the vessel to pay her keep.  A plan to charter her out for halibut fishing was vetoed by F.W. Huestis, president of the Corwin Trading Company, reportedly because of insurance costs.

Passenger and freight service

By 1902 the Corwin was licensed to carry passengers as well as freight. Accommodations were rearranged to carry 35 first-class and 50 steerage passengers. She departed Seattle in May and spent the summer and early fall serving Nome and surrounding towns and camps as far north as Deering on Kotzebue Sound.  She underwent further modification at Moran's yard in Seattle before the 1904 season.   This work extended or replaced the stern cabin to give her an entire second deck as well as a vertical stem (fitted with a steel ice protector), two new deckhouses, and a forward pilothouse.  This so altered her appearance that only a few of her numerous subsequent photographs give any hint of her past as a schooner. Besides the outward changes she was modernized with addition of electric lighting throughout the ship and running water in all staterooms. The changes added six first-class staterooms and more steerage space, bringing her capacity to 100 passengers and about 200 tons freight.  One source reports the cost of the rebuilding as $40000. When she headed out for Alaska in May 1904 after addition of the second deck there were rumors the modification had made her topheavy. Some passengers complained before departure that she was overloaded and unseaworthy.  Inspectors ordered that all freight be stowed below deck, but permitted her to sail.  Subsequently, there were reports that wreckage from the ship had been found on Vancouver Island leading to fears she was lost, but she reached Nome safely on June 8.  The Victoria Daily Colonist could not find the origin of the reports and branded them a deliberate hoax.

The Corwin continued in the passenger and freight business and from 1906 to 1910 held a contract to transport mail to towns on Norton Sound and the Seward Peninsula. She was the first ship to reach Nome in the spring in 1902–1909, 1913 and 1914. She generally returned to Puget Sound in the fall and was often the last ship out of Nome. In part, her early arrivals were due to the fact that she was sheathed and retained a protected and reinforced bow for ice work.  In 1908, after arriving at Nome during a particularly bad ice season, the Corwin headed out again and cut channels to free three steamers that were stuck in the ice 50 miles from Nome, one (the Victoria) in danger of sinking and all in danger of being carried north by moving ice. 
On June 11, 1909, Corwin received a distress call from St. Croix a vessel trapped in the ice and taking on water South of Nome. Corwin refused to come to the aid of St. Croix for no less than $6,000.
In 1914, it was arranged that she would lead the waiting fleet of steamers into Nome, following closely as the Revenue Cutter Bear picked out a channel through the ice. For most of her merchant career, she was owned by the Pacific Coal and Transportation Company (successor to the Corwin Trading Company), and her official home port was listed as Boston. Captain West returned as Master from 1902 to 1910; his wife Gertrude sailed with him as Ship's Clerk.  Most of the crew were Eskimo (they were less likely to desert the ship to go prospecting), and the kitchen staff were Chinese.  The Corwin held daily fire drills, and was equipped with wireless since the 1904 refit. In 1911 and 1912, the Corwin was listed as a ship of the Western Alaska Steamship Company.  In 1913, her home port was listed as Seattle and her owner as Ben Moyses.

Attempted Karluk rescue
In 1914, a wealthy Nome mine-owner and businessman, Jafet Lindeberg, chartered the Corwin (Captain R.J. Healy) from the Kotzebue Transportation and Trading Company to attempt a rescue the Karluk survivors from Wrangel Island. She reached Wrangel Island one day after the survivors had been rescued by Olaf Swenson and his crew in the King & Winge. She then proceeded to look for four missing members of Karluk's crew, circling Herald Island without seeing any sign of the missing men. The Corwin struck a reef off Cape Douglas on her return trip and went hard aground.  She was refloated by jettisoning and lightering supplies to lighten ship, with  assistance from the USRC Bear and a crew from the Nome Lifesaving station.

Ultimate fate
By 1916, the Corwin was majority-owned by Schubach & Hamilton, who sold her to Mexican owners. She burned in drydock at Salina Cruz that same year.

Legacy

Several places in Alaska and Yukon are named for the Corwin, including Corwin Bluff (the bluff near Cape Lisburne containing the Corwin Coal Mine), Corwin Rock in the Aleutian Islands, and possibly Cape Corwin on Nunivak Island.  Kivalina lagoon was called Corwin Lagoon by the United States Coast and Geodetic Survey from 1884 to about 1950.  The Corwin Cliffs in the Saint Elias Mountains, Yukon were named for the Corwin by I.C Russell in 1890.

A contemporaneous model of the Corwin built by Captain Thomas Mountain is in the collection of the Oregon State Historical Society and was displayed at the Alaska State Museum in 2006.

See also
 European and American voyages of scientific exploration

Notes

References

 Alaska State Museums (2006) Bulletin (24) Fall 2006 p3.
 Anonymous (1910) Freighting from steamer Corwin with dog teams; Alaska's Digital Archives, Perry D. Palmer Photograph Album. Archives, University of Alaska, Fairbanks UAF-2004-120-10. (Photographer possibly H.G.Kaiser)
 Baker, Marcus (1906)  "Geographic dictionary of Alaska, ed 2" United States Geological Survey Bulletin 299
 
Bureau of Navigation, US Dept. of Commerce. Annual list of merchant vessels of the United States;  1901 p226; 1903 p 216; 1904 p 211; 1909 p 177; 1913 Part 2 p. 149 and Part 6 p49; 1915 p 108. Government Printing Office, Washington.
 
 
 Commissioner of Navigation.  Annual Report of the Commissioner of Navigation to the Secretary of Commerce and Labor for the Fiscal Year Ended June 30, 1912 Radio apparatus on vessels. 3. Vessels equipped subject to the act and inspected by the wireless inspectors, in detail, by ports. Table: Departing from Port Townsend, pp 159–160.
 Curtis, Asahel (1902) U.S. Revenue Cutter CORWIN bound for Nome, 1902 (Cataloger's title)
 DeGroff, Edward (undated) U.S.R.C. CORWIN. Sitka, Alaska; Alaska's Digital Archives, Wickersham State Historic Site. Photographs. ASL-P277-018-095
 Dictionary of American Naval Fighting Ships U.S. Department of the Navy - Naval Historical Center
 
 48th Congress 1st session (1884) Senate Reports 572, 573 Congressional Serial Set, Government Printing Office, Washington
 50th Congress 1st Session (1888)House Report 456 Congressional Serial Set, Government Printing Office, Washington
 Gagne-Hawes, Genevieve Juneau Empire Web posted Thursday, August 12, 1999. "1882 letter sheds light on Angoon tragedy"
 Harrison, Edward Sanford (1905)  Nome and Seward Peninsula  History, description, biographies, and stories. Metropolitan Press, Seattle,  souvenir edition. p374.
 
 
 
 
 
 Keeler, Nicholas Edward (1906)  A Trip to Alaska and the Klondike in the Summer of 1905 Ebbert & Richardson Co., Cincinnati.
 Kimball, Frank Willard (1912) "Alaska's mail service"The Overland Monthly 59 (4) April 12 pp 293–297
 
 Kingsbury, A.G. (1900) "Seattle and the Nome rush" National Magazine 12 (3) June pp 162–167
 
 Lomen Bros (1910) U.S. Revenue Cutter CORWIN in the ice, n.d. (Cataloger's title) This photograph can be dated to June 1910 by the presence of the gasoline schooner Helen Johnston in the background.
 Morning Leader (Port Townsend) November 29, 1902, page three.  "Steamer Corwin down from Nome"
 Morning Leader (Port Townsend) November 1, 1903, page one.  "Former revenue cutter Corwin icebound"
 
 National Geographic 15 (12) December, 1904 p 500. "Geographic notes"
 Natural Resources Canada. Canadian geographical names. Geographical names search service query Corwin.
 Naval Historical Center. Shelling of the Alaskan native American village of Angoon, October, 1882 Original reports from M.A. Healy, E.C. Merriman, W.G. Morris, and supporting documents, in PDF form.
 New York Times January 22, 1877 page 2. A REVENUE CUTTER SEIZED
 New York Times Nov 7, 1881 page 2. "A summer in polar seas. Captain Hooper's report..."
 New York Times April 30, 1882, page 8. "The errand of the Corwin"
 New York Times June 22, 1882, page 2. "The loss of the Rodgers; A thrilling story of disaster from the Arctic sea"
 New York Times June 24, 1882, page 2. "Crew of the Rodgers at San Francisco"
 New York Times June 16, 1891 page 2. Untitled; dateline San Francisco
 New York Times July 3, 1891, page 8. "New Guns for revenue cutters"
 New York Times Nov 9, 1891, page 5. LIEUT. ROBINSON'S GRAVE.; THE STORY OF HIS LAMENTABLE DEATH AWAY UP IN ICY BAY.
 New York Times January 17, 1892, page 2.  "Work for Revenue Cutters. The Rush and Corwin to be equipped for naval service"
 New York Times November 16, 1892, page 9. TROUBLE OVER THE DEFICIT
 New York Times December 6, 1893, page 1 (a). "Bound to keep the peace; Minister Willis will have no rioting in Hawaii"
 New York Times December 6, 1893, page 1 (b)."The Corwin's secret mission; She sails for Honolulu with an agent of the State Department"
 New York Times January 20, 1894, page 8. "Will set up as a republic; Hawaiians preparing a constitution"
 New York Times May 19, 1895, page 25. OUR FLEET IN BERING SEA; For the First Time It Will Consist Entirely of Revenue Cutters.
 New York Times December 14, 1895. "The Bering Sea fleet. Grant and Corwin being repaired."
 New York Times April 9, 1896, page 2. THE BERING SEA PATROL FLEET.; It Will Sail from San Francisco for Its Field Next Monday
 New York Times September 11, 1896, page 7. THE BERING SEA FLEET.; It Is Doing Active Cruising Work and All Hands Are Well.
 New York Times October 17, 1899.  "Food short at Cape Nome.; Revenue Cutter Corwin reports destitution among the miners and the prospect of starvation"
 New York Times May 24, 1904 "Many lives may be lost; Wreckage found from Alaska steamer that had eighty-nine passengers" Page 2
 New York Times August 15, 1909. "Delivering mail in our farthest North" Page SM7
 New York Times May 31, 1914.  "Cutter Bear to go for Karluk's men"
 New York Times September 22, 1914  "Planning for Karluk men; Survivors, now on the cutter Bear, to be sent to Vancouver"
 Nourse, J. E. (1884) American explorations in the ice zones D. Lothrop, Boston.
 Nowell, Frank (1902) 	Passengers on beach waiting for steamship CORWIN, Teller, Alaska, October 30, 1902 (Cataloger's title)
 Nowell, Frank (1907 (a))Steamer Corwin at edge of ice. (Cataloger's title)
 Nowell, Frank (1907 (b)) Yupik people on beach at Whalen, Siberia, with Steamship CORWIN in distance, 1907  (Cataloger's title)
 Packard, Winthrop. (1900) "Coal mining at the north pole" National Magazine 13(3) December pp 163–170
 
 San Francisco Chronicle September 6, 1909, page 16. " 'Chronicle'  First  Paper  on  Coast  to  Install  Wireless  Apparatus"
 
 Stearns, Ezra S.; William Frederick Whitcher; Edward Everett Parker (1908) Genealogical and family history of the state of New Hampshire. Lewis Publishing Comp v. 4.  "Alonzo Elliott" p 1748
 Stefansson, Vilhjalmur (1921) The friendly Arctic; the story of five years in polar regions. Macmillan, N.Y. pp 726–730.
 
 Tacoma Public Library, "Ships and Shipping Database" accessed May 26, 2009 query Corwin. This source quotes: (a) Lewis & Dryden's Marine History of the Pacific Northwest. New York: Antiquarian Press, Ltd., 1961., p 245; (b) Lewis & Dryden's Marine History of the Pacific Northwest. New York: Antiquarian Press, Ltd., 1961, pp 428–9, 436;  and (c) Gordon Newell, "Maritime events of 1899," H. W. McCurdy Marine History of the Pacific Northwest. Seattle: Superior, 1966, p 57; (d) Gordon Newell, "Maritime events" [various years], H.W. McCurdy Marine History of the Pacific Northwest. Seattle: Superior, 1966., pp. 224, 227; (e) Gordon Newell, "Maritime events of 1916," H.W. McCurdy Marine History of the Pacific Northwest. Seattle: Superior, 1966., p. 265.
 The Catherine Sudden US District Court, 2nd division, Nome June 7, 1902 US 9th Circuit
 The revenue cutter US District Court, District of Oregon January 2, 1877 US 9th Circuit
 United States Coast Guard, Historians Office. (a)  "Thomas Corwin (a.k.a. Corwin), 1876" (b) "Eighteenth, Nineteenth & Early Twentieth Century Revenue Cutters. A Historic Image Gallery" see particularly Boutwell, Dexter, Rush, and Perry; (c)"Coast Guard Cutters & Craft: A complete list with information & photography".
United States Coast Guard (1935) Record of Movements, Vessels of the United States Coast Guard, 1790-December 31, 1933. Reprinted by the Coast Guard Historian's Office, Washington, 1989, pp 191–196.
 United States Geological Survey Geographic names identification system query Corwin (state=Alaska).
 Vanderlip, Washington Baker and Homer Bezaleel Hulbert (1903). In search of a Siberian Klondike The Century co., New York
 Victoria Daily Colonist Feb 15, 1900 p2 "Marine news"
 Victoria Daily Colonist April 25, 1901 p3 "Corwin here"
 Victoria Daily Colonist Nov 26, 1901 "Marine notes"
 Victoria Daily Colonist May 9, 1901 p3 "Marine notes"
 Victoria Daily Colonist May 20, 1904 p8 "Ordered below. Corwin deck cargo has to be stowed under hatches"
 Victoria Daily Colonist May 24, 1904 p3 "Probably a hoax"
 Victoria Daily Colonist May 26, 1904, p8 "Spoke Corwin far to the north. Tug pilot reports American steamer proceeding to Nome"
 Victoria Daily Colonist June 25, 1904. "Arrival at Nome" page 3
 Victoria Daily Colonist June 19, 1908. "Victoria starts back from Nome"
 West, Ellsworth Luce (1965) as told to Eleanor Ransom Mayhew. Captain's papers: a log of whaling and other sea experiences; Barre Publishers, Barre, MA
 Who's Who in America v6, 1910 p 1909.

Further reading
 Killey, Gwen L. "Opening the Door to Alaska: The Cruises of the Revenue Cutter Thomas Corwin." Naval History (Fall 1988), pp. 23–27.
 Newell, Gordon  and Joe Williamson  (1959) Pacific Coastal Liners, Superior Publishing Co. Seattle. Little on the Corwin but a lot of context.  Has a higher-resolution, but darker version of the Lomen Brothers photograph in which the schooner Helen Johnston is clearly identifiable by the painted name on her bow.
 United States. Revenue-Cutter Service; Muir, John; Nelson, Edward William; Rosse, Irving C; Bean, Tarleton H. Cruise of the revenue steamer Corwin in Alaska and the N. W. Arctic ocean in 1881 ... Notes and memoranda. (1883) Washington, Govt. Print. Off.

External links

  New York Times account of Corwin 1880 cruise June 27, 1881, Page 2

1876 ships
Arctic exploration vessels
Bering Sea
Chukchi Sea
History of Oregon
Jeannette expedition
Pre-statehood history of Alaska
Ships of the United States Revenue Cutter Service
Ships built in Portland, Oregon